The list of ship launches in 1922 includes a chronological list of some ships launched in 1922.



References

Sources

1922
Ship launches